Oberst Paul Aue was a World War I flying ace from the Kingdom of Saxony in the German Empire. Partial records of his early aviation career credit him with 10 aerial victories. He would join the nascent Luftwaffe during the 1930s and serve Germany through World War II. He died in a Russian prison camp in 1945.

Early life
Paul Aue was born on 7 October 1891 in Söbringen, Kingdom of Saxony. He matured into a small man; some sources even call him "diminutive".

World War I
In 1916, Aue served with Kampstaffel 30 of Kampgeschwader 5. Flying a two-seater reconnaissance plane, Aue and his observer managed to down a similar craft, a Royal Aircraft Factory BE.2c, on 25 October 1916. Aue was then credited with two more victories before being transferred to Jasta 10 that same month.

He scored his—and his new squadron's—first victory on 25 March 1917. He struck again on 7 June, wounding a British Spad VII pilot, and driving pilot and plane into captivity. Aue was wounded in action on 19 September 1917 while piloting a Pfalz D.III. During a dogfight at 3,000 meters with two dozen British Royal Naval Air Service planes from Naval 10 Squadron above Roulers, France the German sergeant ace was hit by three English bullets, one of them an explosive round. Though he refused to leave his unit, his wounds kept him out of action until February 1918; he would not score another victory until 3 May 1918, when he shot down a Bristol F.2 Fighter, killing the pilot and wounding the gunner. It would be his last victory while flying the Pfalz, as Jasta 10 was upgrading to Fokker D.VIIs.

On 16 June 1918, Aue attacked and destroyed an enemy observation balloon for his seventh confirmed win. He went on to shoot down three more enemy fighter planes, his last victory coming on 4 September 1918.

Between the wars
Paul Aue joined the nascent Luftwaffe during the 1930s.

World War II
On 1 November 1939, Oberst Paul Aue was appointed to command of Blindflugschule 1 of the Luftwaffe. Blindflugschule 1's ("Blind Flying School 1")'s airfield was shared with a formation of Messerschmitt Me 163 rocket planes. Aue would head the school until 16 April 1945, when the school disbanded. He was captured by the Soviet Army, and died in a prisoner of war camp.

List of aerial victories
Details of Paul Aue's victories are incomplete. An attempt to collate these details and produce a complete victory list appears below.

Please include a source/citation for any additions.

See also Aerial victory standards of World War I

Honors
Paul Aue is known to have earned the following honors:

Kingdom of Saxony: Silver Military Order of Saint Henry awarded on 24 April 1917
Kingdom of Saxony: Gold Military Order of Saint Henry awarded during July 1918
Iron Cross First Class
Silver Friedrich August Medal

Paul Aue also may have been awarded two other decorations:

Saxon Honor Cross with Crown and Swords
Saxon War Merit Cross

Endnotes

References
 Franks, Norman; Bailey, Frank W.; Guest, Russell. Above the Lines: The Aces and Fighter Units of the German Air Service, Naval Air Service and Flanders Marine Corps, 1914–1918. Grub Street, 1993. , .
 Franks, Norman; VanWyngarden, Greg; Weal, John. Fokker D VII Aces of World War 1, Part 1: Volume 53 of Aircraft of the Aces: Volume 53 of Osprey Aircraft of the Aces. Osprey Publishing, 2003. , .
 Gutmann, Jon. Spad VII Aces of World War I: Volume 39 of Aircraft of the Aces Osprey Publishing, 2001. , .
 Gutmann, Jon, and Dempsey, Harry. Bristol F2 Fighter Aces of World War I: Volume 79 of Aircraft of the Aces: Volume 79 of Osprey Aircraft of the Aces. Osprey Publishing, 2007. , .
 Ransom, Steven; Cammann, Hans-Hermann; Laurier, Jim.  Jagdgeschwader 400: Germany's Elite Rocket Fighters: Volume 37 of Aviation Elite Units. Osprey Publishing, 2010. , .
 VanWyngarden, Greg. Pfalz Scout Aces of World War 1: Volume 71 of Aircraft of the Aces. Osprey Publishing, 2006. , .
 — Richthofen's Circus: Jagdgeschwader, Issue 1: Volume 16 of Aviation Elite Units. Osprey Publishing, 2004. , .

1891 births
1945 deaths
German World War I flying aces
Military personnel from Dresden
People from the Kingdom of Saxony
Luftstreitkräfte personnel
Luftwaffe personnel of World War II
German prisoners of war in World War II held by the Soviet Union
German people who died in Soviet detention